The Texas A&M–Commerce Lions women's basketball team (formerly the East Texas State Lions) is the women's intercollegiate basketball program representing Texas A&M University–Commerce. The school competes in the Southland Conference (SLC) in Division I of the National Collegiate Athletic Association (NCAA). For their first 51 years of existence, they competed in the Lone Star Conference of Division II. The A&M–Commerce women's basketball team plays its home games at the University Field House on the university campus in Commerce, Texas. The Lions have won one conference title and has  appeared in the NCAA tournament in 2007, 2019, 2020, and 2021. The team is currently coached by Jason Burton.

History

The women's team was formed in 1971 and played their first season under Susie Knause and finished off with a 10–6 record. Currently they are coached by Jason Burton who is entering his second year with the program. The team's best season came in 2006–07  under coach Denny Downing, when the team finished off with a record of 28–9, the team not only won their first (and only) conference title but also advanced to the elite eight in the NCAA tournament only to be eliminated by Clayton State. The 2006-07 team remains as the only team in program history to make it the national tournament. In 2014 the Lady Lions lost two players (Devin Oliver and Aubree Butts) in a tragic car accident in Paris, Texas, a candle light service was held at the university to honor the two and a plaque was placed in a park in Rowlett to honor Devin Oliver (who was a Rowlett High School alumni). Since their death no player on the women's basketball team has worn their jersey numbers (15 and 25).

Roster

Arena

The A&M-Commerce men and women's basketball teams both share the university field house along with volleyball. The field house was constructed in 1950 and has been home to Men's basketball for over six decades. The Field House covers 69,000 square feet and will seat 5,000 people for either a volleyball or basketball contest. The facility is also the host to the University's Athletic Administration staff, the Sports Medicine Department and the Health and Human Performance Department; in addition to the offices for the basketball, cross country and track and field, golf, soccer and volleyball teams.

The Field House is shaped like an airplane hangar and has space for three basketball courts crossways. The floor allows three games to be played at the same time under one roof. The one lengthwise court is reserved for A&M-Commerce basketball and volleyball matches. With an arched roof, 58 feet from the ground at the highest point, is supported on steel beams that are stationed at one end. The university recently upgraded the hardwood court and placed a giant lion head logo in the center of the court similar to the one at Memorial Stadium.

See also
Texas A&M-Commerce Lions men's basketball

References

External links